Lafayette Street is a street in Lower Manhattan in New York City.

Lafayette Street may also refer to:
 Lafayette Street Terminal (Newark), New Jersey
 Lafayette Street Cemetery, Detroit, Michigan
 Lafayette Street Overpass, historic bridge in Fayetteville, Arkansas

See also
 Lafayette Place (disambiguation)
 LaFayette Road, in Georgia
 Lafayette Road, a section of U.S. Route 1 in New Hampshire
 Lafayette Square (disambiguation)